Solita is a town and municipality in Caquetá Department, Colombia.

Municipalities of Caquetá Department